Rick Salomon (born January 24, 1969) is an American poker player, who is best known for his 2003 sex tape with Paris Hilton. He had high-profile marriages with E.G. Daily, Shannen Doherty, and Pamela Anderson. As a poker player, Salomon won $2.8 million in 2014, $3.3 million in 2016, and $2.84 million in the 2018 versions of the World Series of Poker's Big One for One Drop.

Early life
Salomon was born and raised in Neptune Township, New Jersey. He is of Jewish descent.

Career
Salomon owned an online gambling site.

On July 1, 2014, he won $2.8 million in the World Series of Poker's Big One for One Drop. Four years later, he won $2.84 million at the same event.

Salomon has made regular TV poker appearances on PokerGO shows including World Series of Poker coverage, Super High Roller Bowl coverage, Rob's Home Game, Poker After Dark, and High Stakes Poker. Salomon was one of the new players appearing in Season 8 of High Stakes Poker and appeared in the first eight episodes. Salomon played one of the biggest pots of the season against Bryn Kenney, when he beat Kenney's set with a straight, winning $868,200.

As of February 2021, Salomon has not cashed since 2018, after accumulating live tournament winnings in excess of $9.9 million.

Personal life

Sex tape
In 2003, a sex tape featuring Salomon and then-girlfriend Paris Hilton was leaked onto the Internet. Shortly afterward, Salomon filed a lawsuit against the company that distributed the tape, and against the Hilton family, whom he accused of tarnishing his reputation by suggesting that he had exploited Hilton. Salomon further claimed in his $10 million suit that representatives of the Hiltons tried to discourage media outlets from playing excerpts of the tape by saying that Hilton was underage when the tape was made (which would have made showing the tape illegal – Hilton was actually 19 when the tape was filmed), and were attempting to crush him to preserve the image they had created for her. Hilton later sued the company that released the tape, Kahatani Ltd., for $30 million for violation of privacy and emotional distress.

In April 2004, Salomon began distributing the tape himself through the adult film company Red Light District Video under the title 1 Night in Paris. In July 2004, Salomon dropped his lawsuit against the Hilton family after Paris Hilton's privacy lawsuit was thrown out of court. Salomon and Red Light District Video agreed to pay Hilton $400,000 plus a percentage of the tape's sale profit.

Marriages
In 1995, Salomon married voice actress Elizabeth Daily. The couple had two daughters, Hunter and Tyson, before divorcing in 2000.

In 2002, Salomon married actress Shannen Doherty. The marriage was annulled after nine months.

On September 29, 2007, Salomon and actress Pamela Anderson applied for a marriage license in Las Vegas. Anderson had told talk-show host Ellen DeGeneres in September that she was engaged; she referred to her fiancé only as a poker player. The couple were married on October 6, 2007 during a break between the 7 p.m. and 10 p.m. shows of "Hans Klok's The Beauty of Magic" at Planet Hollywood resort, where Anderson was starring as a magician's assistant. Salomon and Anderson separated less than ten weeks later and, on December 14, Anderson filed for divorce citing irreconcilable differences. Two days later, Anderson and Salomon were seen shopping together. Anderson later posted a message on her website indicating that they were reconciling.  On December 28, 2007, Anderson's attorney filed a proof of service of summons in Los Angeles Superior Court regarding the divorce claim. In February 2008, Anderson filed to have the marriage annulled citing fraud as the reasoning. The following month, Salomon also filed for an annulment citing fraud. The marriage was annulled on March 24, 2008.

In January 2014, Anderson announced she and Salomon had married at an unspecified date.

Anderson again filed for divorce from Salomon on July 3, 2014, while Salomon filed for an annulment in Nevada on the grounds of fraud. On April 29, 2015, her divorce was granted, with a $1 million settlement payment from Salomon to Anderson.

References

External links

1969 births
Living people
Film producers from California
American entertainment industry businesspeople
American poker players
American people of Jewish descent
People from Neptune Township, New Jersey
People from Ocean Township, Monmouth County, New Jersey
People from Hollywood, Los Angeles
Film producers from New Jersey